Brighton Electric is a music studio complex in Brighton, UK, founded in 2000.

The main premises was built in 1897 as the Brighton Corporation Tramways head office.

Details
The main premises was built in 1897 as the Brighton Corporation Tramways head office, located on Coombe Terrace, Lewes Road.

The music studio complex was founded in 2000. It has 17 practice studios and 2 recording studios. There are several mix studios and a mastering suite, 175 capacity live venue/production studio, storage facilities, shop, vegan cafe, venue and bar.

In April 2010 the studio was shortlisted for the 'Studio of the Year' award by Music Week magazine (the winner was Abbey Road Studios). In 2016 Brighton Electric won the Pro Sound News 'Studio Of The Year' Award.

Musicians and bands that have recorded or rehearsed at Brighton Electric include The Cure, British Sea Power, Blood Red Shoes, Foals, The Go! Team, Laura Marling, Noisettes, Neon Saints Brass Band, Lovejoy, The Maccabees, Royal Blood, Nick Cave and Architects.

References

External links 
 

Music in Brighton and Hove
Recording studios in England
Buildings and structures in Brighton and Hove